Falcon-Knight was a brand of automobile produced between 1927 and 1928 by the Willys-Overland Company of Toledo, Ohio.
A separate company, the Falcon Motor Corporation was registered with headquarters  in Detroit, Michigan. The cars were built in a former Garford Truck plant in Elyria, Ohio. The automobiles were well received with "a remarkable reputation for all-around performance and the sales were notably high."

History 
The Falcon-Knight was intended to fit in price between the  Willys Whippet and larger Willys Knight ranges and was priced $1250, $100 less than the Willys Knight 70A Roadster. It was powered by a six cylinder Knight sleeve valve engine. Except for the engine, much of the car is actually the same as the Model 93A Whippet with many parts being interchangeable. 

In January 1928, a new model 12 was announced with mainly cosmetic changes, and the last cars were made in March 1929 after which the plant made truck parts.

Models
1926 Model 10 Landau
1927 Model 10 Sedan
1927 Model 10 Brougham (2 door)
1927 Model 10 Coupe
1927 Model 10 Roadster
1927 Model 10 Gray Ghost Roadster
1928 Model 12 Sedan
1928 Model 12 Coach
1928 Model 12 Coupe
1928 Model 12 Roadster

References

External links
Falcon-Knight photo gallery from the Willys-Overland-Knight Registry
Restoring a Falcon-Knight

Cars powered by Knight engines
Defunct motor vehicle manufacturers of the United States